Hasanabad (also Romanized as Ḩasanābād) is a village in Nivan Rural District, in the Central District of Golpayegan County, Isfahan Province, Iran. At the 2006 census, its population was 16, in 7 families.

References 

Populated places in Golpayegan County